Elton Monteiro Almada (born 22 February 1994) is a professional footballer who plays as a centre back for Hanoi Police FC. Born in Switzerland, he is a youth international for Portugal.

Football career
On 16 August 2014, Monteiro made his professional debut with Braga B in a 2014–15 Segunda Liga match against Aves.

International career
Monteiro was born in Switzerland to a Cape Verdean family, and has Swiss and Portuguese nationality. He is a youth international for Portugal. His brother Joël Monteiro is also a professional footballer.

Career statistics

References

External links

Stats and profile at LPFP 

1994 births
Living people
People from Sion, Switzerland
Portuguese footballers
Portugal under-21 international footballers
Portugal youth international footballers
Swiss men's footballers
Portuguese people of Cape Verdean descent
Swiss people of Portuguese descent
Swiss people of Cape Verdean descent
Portuguese expatriate footballers
Association football defenders
Liga Portugal 2 players
Swiss Challenge League players
Swiss Super League players
Ekstraklasa players
S.C. Braga B players
Club Brugge KV players
Associação Académica de Coimbra – O.A.F. players
FC Lausanne-Sport players
Miedź Legnica players
Expatriate footballers in Poland
Sportspeople from Valais